Giovanni Battista Palatino ( 1515 -  1575), also known as Giambattista, was an Italian calligrapher. He was born in Rossano, Calabria, but moved to Rome as a young man. In 1538, Palatino acquired Roman citizenship, much to his pride. Palatino's Libro nuovo d'imparare a scrivere is the best-known Renaissance treatise on calligraphy. He dedicated it to the Academia dello sdegno (Academy of the Disdainful), of which he was secretary. As a calligrapher, Palatino was fascinated by ciphers and generally by the metamorphosis of the alphabet. The serif typeface designed by Hermann Zapf and released in 1948 was named after Giambattista Palatino.

References

Sources

1510s births
1570s deaths
16th-century calligraphers
Italian calligraphers
People from Rossano